Clara Dupont-Monod (born 7 October 1973, in Paris) is a French journalist and woman of letters. She was awarded the Prix Femina in 2021.

Journalism 
She began her career as a journalist for the magazine Cosmopolitan, joining the staff of Marianne as a senior reporter at age 24. In 2007, she became editor-in-chief of the cultural pages of Marianne.

On August 31, 2009, Dupont-Monod joined the staff of the  program on Canal+. In the autumn of 2011, she was one of the columnists of the radio show Les Affranchis on France Inter.

At the beginning of 2012, she presented the literary program Clara et les chics livres, every Saturday on France Inter, accompanied by two columnists. At the beginning of 2014, she was replaced by Léa Salamé.

Since September 2014, Dupont-Monod has been hosting a literary column in the news program  on France Inter.

Novels 
Dupont-Monod has also written several novels. Her first work, Eova Luciole, was published in 1998. Her novel La Folie du roi Marc explores the forgotten husband of Yseut, drawn from the myth of Tristan and Iseult. Histoire d'une prostituée tells about the daily life and character of a prostitute, whom the writer met and followed for a year.

Her fourth novel, La Passion selon Juette (2007), describes the struggle of a twelfth-century woman who refuses the dictates of a world in which women were constrained by an all-powerful Church. She drew from the biography of Yvette of Huy, written in medieval Latin by her friend, the religious Hugues de Floreffe. This novel was awarded the prix Laurent-Bonelli Virgin-Lire in its first year. The novel was nominated to the Prix Feminas list. It was a finalist on the short list of nominations for the 2007 Prix Goncourt.

In 2011 she published Nestor rend les armes, a novel about an obese man. This novel was a finalist in the first selection for the 2011 Prix Femina.

On 4 December 2014 Dupont-Monod was awarded the prize of the magazine , for her book on Eleanor of Aquitaine, Le roi disait que j'étais diable. It was also awarded the Prix Maurice Genevoix.

In 2021, she published S'adapter, a novel about siblings and disability. The novel was a finalist in the second selection for the 2021 prix Goncourt. S'adapter was awarded the 2021 Prix Femina.

Bibliography

Novels 
1998: Eova Luciole, Éditions Grasset, 
2000: La folie du roi Marc, Grasset, 
2003: Histoire d'une prostituée, Grasset, 
2007: La Passion selon Juette, Grasset, 
2008: (Collaboration ) Bains de nuit, with Catherine Guetta (author), Fayard
2011: Nestor rend les armes, Paris, Sabine Wespieser Éditeur, 
2014: Le roi disait que j’étais diable, Grasset, Prix Maurice Genevoix
2018: La Révolte, Éditions Stock, 
2021: S'adapter, Éditions Stock, Prix Femina

Video 
 (Co-screenwriter) Sans état d'âme, 2008, TF1

References

External links 
 Clara Dupont-Monod on Babelio
 Clara Dupont-Monod on L'Express
 N'ayons plus peur des fous, la chronique de Clara Dupont Monod on YouTube
 Publications by Clara Dupont-Monod on CAIRN
 L'homme par qui la pilule vint aux femmes on Le Huffington Post

21st-century French non-fiction writers
French women novelists
21st-century French women writers
Comics critics
1973 births
Writers from Paris
Living people
Prix Femina winners